Bar Aftab-e Humeh (also Romanized as Bar Āftāb-e Ḩūmeh and Barāftāb-e Homeh) is a village in Chamsangar Rural District, Papi District, Khorramabad County, Lorestan Province, Iran. At the 2006 census, its population was 93, in 15 families.

References 

Towns and villages in Khorramabad County